Daniel Badger Priest (March 9, 1830 – September 6, 1870) was an American lawyer and legislator.

Born in Putnam County, Indiana, Priest graduated from Asbury University. In 1850, he moved to Fort Snelling, Minnesota Territory to farm. He moved to Monroe, Wisconsin in 1852 to practice law. In 1854, he ran for the Green County clerk of board of supervisors as a member of the Hunker faction of the Democratic Party. Then, in 1855, Priest moved to Richland Center, Wisconsin and continue to practice law. In 1861, Priest moved to Viroqua, Wisconsin. While in Viroqua, Priest served as District Attorney of Vernon County, Wisconsin. He also served in the Wisconsin State Assembly in 1863 and 1868. In 1869, Priest moved to Sparta, Wisconsin where he died. During his stay in Viroqua and Sparta, Priest was also editor of the local newspapers.

Notes

External links
 

1830 births
1870 deaths
People from Putnam County, Indiana
People from Monroe, Wisconsin
People from Sparta, Wisconsin
People from Richland Center, Wisconsin
People from Viroqua, Wisconsin
Asbury University alumni
Wisconsin lawyers
Editors of Wisconsin newspapers
Members of the Wisconsin State Assembly
19th-century American journalists
American male journalists
19th-century American male writers
19th-century American politicians
19th-century American lawyers